Abgrall is a surname. People with this surname include:

 Dennis Abgrall (born 1953), Canadian ice hockey player
 Jean-Marie Abgrall (born 1950), French forensic psychiatrist
 Noémie Abgrall (born 1999), French cyclist

Breton-language surnames
Surnames of Breton origin